The 16th Utah Legislative Assembly was a session of the Utah Territorial Legislature which was elected in 1866, in Salt Lake City Council Hall.

Major Legislation

Appropriations
 Territorial Appropriation Bill

Incorporations of Cities and Counties
 An Act to incorporate Beaver City, in Beaver County
 An Act changing the County Seat of Kane County
 An Act to incorporate Fillmore City, in Millard County
 An Act to incorporate the City of Grantsville
 An Act incorporating Brigham City
 An Act incorporating the City of Coalville, in Summit County

State Commissions
 Resolution appointing a Military Code Commission

References

Utah Territorial Legislature